Juri Yokoyama (横山 樹理 Yokoyama Juri, born March 9, 1955, in Kitakyushu) is a former volleyball player from Japan, who was a member of the Japan Women's National Team that won the gold medal at the 1976 Summer Olympics.

National team
1974: 1st place in the World Championship
1976: 1st place in the Olympic Games of Montreal
1978: 2nd place in the World Championship
1982: 4th place in the World Championship

References
Profile

1955 births
Living people
Japanese women's volleyball players
Volleyball players at the 1976 Summer Olympics
Olympic volleyball players of Japan
Olympic gold medalists for Japan
Sportspeople from Kitakyushu
Olympic medalists in volleyball
Asian Games medalists in volleyball
Volleyball players at the 1974 Asian Games
Medalists at the 1976 Summer Olympics
Medalists at the 1974 Asian Games
Asian Games gold medalists for Japan